Drunče is a municipality and village in Jindřichův Hradec District in the South Bohemian Region of the Czech Republic. It has about 50 inhabitants.

Administrative parts
The village of Annovice is an administrative part of Drunče.

References

Villages in Jindřichův Hradec District